Sergey Badalyan (July 4, 1947 – November 24, 1999) was an Armenian politician, first secretary of the Armenian Communist Party from 1991 to 1999. 

He was a "special guest" of the Parliamentary Assembly of the Council of Europe from 20 September 1999 to 24 January 2000, although he died before the completion of his tenure.

References

1947 births
1999 deaths
Armenian Communist Party politicians
Politicians from Yerevan
Candidates for President of Armenia